{{Automatic taxobox
| image = Pseudogramma gregoryi - pone.0010676.g056.png
| image_caption = Pseudogramma gregoryi
| taxon = Pseudogramma
| authority = Bleeker, 1875
| type_species = Pseudochromis polyacanthus
| type_species_authority = Bleeker, 1856<ref name = CofF>{{Cof record | genid = 3797 | title = Pseudogramma | access-date = 30 August 2020}}</ref> 
}}Pseudogramma is a genus of marine ray-finned fish, related to the groupers and classified within the subfamily Epinephelinae of the family Serranidae. They live on coral reefs and exhibit cryptic colors and patterns to conceal them. They are mainly found in the Indo-Pacific with one species in the eastern central Atlantic Ocean.

Species
There are currently 14 recognized species in the genus:
 Pseudogramma astigma J. E. Randall & C. C. Baldwin, 1997 (Spot-less podge)
 Pseudogramma australis J. E. Randall & C. C. Baldwin, 1997 (Pascua podge) 
 Pseudogramma axelrodi G. R. Allen & D. R. Robertson, 1995 
 Pseudogramma brederi (Hildebrand, 1940) (Confused podge) 
 Pseudogramma erythrea J. E. Randall & C. C. Baldwin, 1997 (Caban podge) 
 Pseudogramma galzini J. T. Williams & Viviani, 2016 (Galzin's podge) 
 Pseudogramma gregoryi (Breder, 1927) (Reef podge) 
 Pseudogramma guineensis (Norman, 1935) 
 Pseudogramma megamyctera J. E. Randall & C. C. Baldwin, 1997 (Big-nostril podge)  
 Pseudogramma paucilepis J. T. Williams & Viviani, 2016 (Weak-scaled podge) 
 Pseudogramma pectoralis J. E. Randall & C. C. Baldwin, 1997 (Pectoral podge)
 Pseudogramma polyacantha (Bleeker, 1856) (Pale-spot podge) 
 Pseudogramma thaumasia (C. H. Gilbert, 1900) (Pacific reef podge)  
 Pseudogramma xantha'' J. E. Randall, C. C. Baldwin & J. T. Williams, 2002 (Yellow podge)

References

Taxa named by Pieter Bleeker
Grammistini